Platyptilia semnopis is a moth of the family Pterophoridae. It is known from Brazil.

The wingspan is about 24 mm. Adults are on wing in January, February, May, July, September, October and December.

External links

semnopis
Endemic fauna of Brazil
Moths described in 1931
Moths of South America